The Campaign of Trabzon occurred in 1510 after Shah Ismail sent a military contingent against Trabzon, then governed by Selim I.

Background
In 1505 Shah Ismail’s brother set out with an army of 3,000 men to pillage Selim’s province, however the Safavid army was routed and Selim pursued them as far as Erzincan where he massacred many and captured their arms and munitions. In 1507 Shah Ismail led a raid against the Dulkadirids, in response Selim attacked Erzincan in 1507 and defeated the Safavid army.

Battle
In 1510 Shah Ismail sent a military contingent against the same place that Selim had successfully defended in 1505. Shah Ismail’s brother advanced through Ottoman territory and marched against Trabzon but he was defeated by Selim.

Aftermath
Tensions between the Safavids and Ottomans continued, in 1511 Şahkulu who was sent by Shah Ismail led a rebellion in Anatolia but was eventually defeated and killed by the Ottomans. Once Selim had ascended to the throne as sultan he marched against Shah Ismail’s army in the Battle of Chaldiran and defeated the Safavids.

References

Battles involving the Ottoman Empire
Wars involving the Ottoman Empire
Battles involving Iran